Cousin Skeeter, an American television series that originally aired on Nickelodeon. It premiered on September 1, 1998 and ended on March 11, 2001, with a total of 52 episodes over the course of 3 seasons.

Series overview

Episodes

Season 1 (1998–99)

Season 2 (1999–2000)

Season 3 (2001)

References

External links
 

Cousin Skeeter